The 2016 VBA season is the inaugural season of the Vietnam Basketball Association. The regular season began on August 6, 2016, and ended on October 23, 2016. The playoffs began on October 26, 2016, and ended with the 2016 VBA Finals on November 16, 2016, with the Danang Dragons winning the inaugural VBA title after sweeping the Hochiminh City Wings in 2 games.

Teams

Venues and locations

Personnel and sponsorship

Import players
Each team is allowed 2 heritage players and 1 foreign player.

Regular season
The regular season began on August 6 with the Hanoi Buffaloes hosting the Saigon Heat, and ended on October 23 with the Heat hosting the Buffaloes.

Standings

Tiebreakers
The Heat clinched #1 seed over the Wings based on head-to-head record (3–1).

Playoffs
The 2016 VBA playoffs began on October 26, 2016, and ended on November 12, 2016.

Bracket

Statistics

Individual statistic leaders

Team statistic leaders

Awards

Season MVP: Rudolphe Joly (Danang Dragons)
Season Local MVP: Lê Ngọc Tú (Hochiminh City Wings)
Defensive Player of the Year: Justin Young (Hochiminh City Wings)
Rising Star: Khoa Tran (Saigon Heat)
Sixth Man of the Year: Nguyễn Phú Hoàng (Hanoi Buffaloes)
Coach of the Year: Todd Purves (Hanoi Buffaloes)
 All-VBA First Team
 F Darrell Miller (Saigon Heat)
 F Jaywuan Hill (Hochiminh City Wings)
 G Tam Dinh (Cantho Catfish)
 G David Arnold (Saigon Heat)
 G Lê Ngọc Tú (Hochiminh City Wings)

References

External links
 Official website

Vietnam Basketball Association seasons
2016–17 in Vietnamese basketball
2016–17 in Asian basketball leagues